Aslauga katangana is a butterfly in the family Lycaenidae. It is found in the eastern part of the Democratic Republic of the Congo.

References

Butterflies described in 1937
Aslauga
Endemic fauna of the Democratic Republic of the Congo
Butterflies of Africa